The 1946 Notre Dame Fighting Irish football team was an American football team that represented the University of Notre Dame as an independent during the 1946 college football season. In their fourth year under head coach Frank Leahy, the Irish compiled an 8–0–1 and were ranked No. 1 in the final AP Poll. The season also produced the 1946 Army vs. Notre Dame football game, a scoreless tie between undefeated teams ranked No. 1 and No. 2.

The 1946 Notre Dame team dominated both on defense and offense, ranking first nationally in total offense (441.3 yards per game), rushing offense (340.1 yards per game), and total defense (allowing 141.7 yards per game). Despite ranking as the nation's top rushing offense, no Notre Dame player ranked among the national rushing leaders, as multiple backs shared the rushing load, including Emil Sitko (54 carries, 346 yards), Terry Brennan (74 carries, 329 yards), Jim Mello (61 carries, 307 yards), Bill Gompers (51 carries, 279 yards), and John Panelli (58 carries, 265 yards).

Two Notre Dame players, quarterback Johnny Lujack and tackle George Connor, were consensus first-team picks for the 1946 All-America college football team. Center George Strohmeyer  and guard John Mastrangelo also received first-team All-America honors from multiple selectors.

From 1946 to 1949, Notre Dame compiled a 36-0-2 record and claims three national championships. Sports Illustrated rated these Notre Dame teams as the second best sports dynasty (professional or collegiate) of the 20th century and second greatest college football dynasty.

Schedule

Post-season

Award winners
George Connor - Outland Trophy

All-Americans:

College Football Hall of Fame Inductees:

Notre Dame leads all universities in players inducted.

1947 NFL Draft

The 1947 NFL Draft was held on December 16, 1946. The following Fighting Irish were selected.

References

Notre Dame
Notre Dame Fighting Irish football seasons
College football national champions
College football undefeated seasons
Notre Dame Fighting Irish football